Usk is a hamlet in British Columbia, Canada just off Highway 16 north-east of Terrace on the north bank of the Skeena River. Once famous for berry-growing, a flood in the 1930s destroyed most of the community. A few people still live there now. Access is by the Usk Ferry, a reaction ferry, or passenger-only cablecar when the river is iced over. The Usk station is served by Via Rail's Jasper – Prince Rupert train.

Between Usk and Kitselas, further downstream, is Kitselas Canyon.

External links
 Pictures of the hamlet (and area)
 Map of Usk

Populated places in the Regional District of Kitimat–Stikine
Unincorporated settlements in British Columbia
Skeena Country